Cingulata is an order of armored placental mammals. Members of this order are called cingulates, or colloquially, armadillos. They are primarily found in South America, though the northern naked-tailed armadillo is found mainly in Central America and the nine-banded armadillo has a range extending into North America. They are generally found in forests, but also savannas, shrublands, and grasslands. They all follow a similar body plan, and range in size from the pink fairy armadillo, at 11 cm (4 in) plus a 2 cm (1 in) tail, to the giant armadillo, at 100 cm (39 in) plus a 50 cm (20 in) tail. No population estimates have been made for any cingulate species, though the giant armadillo and the Brazilian three-banded armadillo are categorized as vulnerable species.

The twenty-two extant species of Cingulata are divided into two families: Dasypodidae, containing a single genus of nine species in the subfamily Dasypodinae, and Chlamyphoridae, containing thirteen species split between the two genera in the subfamily Chlamyphorinae, three in the subfamily Euphractinae, and three in the subfamily Tolypeutinae. Prior to 2016, all four subfamilies were included in Dasypodidae, with Chlamyphoridae containing only extinct species of glyptodonts. Over one hundred extinct Cingulata species have been discovered, though due to ongoing research and discoveries the exact number and categorization is not fixed.

Conventions

Conservation status codes listed follow the International Union for Conservation of Nature (IUCN) Red List of Threatened Species. Range maps are provided wherever possible; if a range map is not available, a description of the cingulate's range is provided. Ranges are based on the IUCN Red List for that species unless otherwise noted. All extinct species or subspecies listed alongside extant species went extinct after 1500 CE, and are indicated by a dagger symbol "".

Classification
The order Cingulata consists of two families, Dasypodidae and Chlamyphoridae. Dasypodidae contains nine species in a single genus, while Chlamyphoridae contains thirteen species in eight genera, divided into three subfamilies. Many of these species are further subdivided into subspecies. This does not include hybrid species or extinct prehistoric species.

Family Dasypodidae
 Subfamily Dasypodinae
 Genus Dasypus (long-nosed armadillos): nine species

Family Chlamyphoridae
 Subfamily Chlamyphorinae
 Genus Calyptophractus (greater fairy armadillo): one species
 Genus Chlamyphorus (pink fairy armadillo): one species
 Subfamily Euphractinae
 Genus Chaetophractus (hairy armadillos): two species
 Genus Euphractus (six-banded armadillo): one species
 Genus Zaedyus (pichi): one species
 Subfamily Tolypeutinae
 Genus Cabassous (naked-tailed armadillos): four species
 Genus Priodontes (giant armadillo): one species
 Genus Tolypeutes (three-banded armadillos): two species

Cingulates
The following classification is based on the taxonomy described by the reference work Mammal Species of the World (2005), with augmentation by generally accepted proposals made since using molecular phylogenetic analysis.

Dasypodidae

Subfamily Dasypodinae

Chlamyphoridae

Subfamily Chlamyphorinae

Subfamily Euphractinae

Subfamily Tolypeutinae

References

Sources

 
 
 

 
cingulates
cingulates